Napoleon Stadium is a multi-use stadium in Acre, Israel. It was mostly used for football matches and hosted the home games of Hapoel Acre. The capacity of the stadium was 5,000 spectators at its peak. The stadium is now used for Hapoel Acre training. The stadium was named for the famous general Napoleon Bonaparte.

External links
 Stadium information

Defunct football venues in Israel
Sports venues in Northern District (Israel)
Sport in Acre, Israel
Buildings and structures in Acre, Israel